The Bača is a river in northwestern Slovenia with a length of . It runs from Bača pri Podbrdu to Bača pri Modreju, where it joins the Idrijca River as its last right tributary. It has a pluvio-nival regime and belongs to the Adriatic Sea Basin.

References

External links

Municipality of Tolmin
Rivers of the Slovene Littoral